A Long Way from Douala is a novel written by Cameroonian writer Max Lobe and translated by Ros Schwartz. It was published by Other Press in 2021. Originally published as Loin de Douala in 2018, it tells the story of Jean Moussima Bobé who journeyed with his best friend to find his elder brother.

Background 
The book was originally published in French in 2018 and translated by Ros Schwartz in 2021. It is Lobe's first novel to be translated into English.
In an interview with European Literature Network, Schwartz noted that her translation for Lobe's story in Words Without Border and Fatou Diome's The Belly of the Atlantic could be reasons for contracting her to translate the book.

Plot 
The story follows Jean Moussima Bobé, a student University of Douala, who sets off with his best friend, Simon, to find his older brother, Roger who went to Europe to achieve his football dream.
Unknown to Simon, Jean had a crush on him.
On their way, they met Gazelle, a human trafficker and an insultive female police inspector.

Themes 
Themes in the novel include terrorism, child abuse, authoritarianism, migration and homophobia.

Style 
Lobe deployed the use Camfranglais in conveying words in order to bring in the familiarity of travelling locally.

Reception 
Kirkus Reviews called it "[a]n entertaining, decidedly offbeat coming-of-age story." It was listed in Brittle Paper's Notable Books of 2021

References 

2020 Cameroonian novels
African diaspora literature